Cophotis ceylanica, the Ceylon deaf agama, is an agamid species endemic to Sri Lanka.

Description
Body is compressed. Head is narrow. Long dorso-nuchal crest developed. Temporal scales with 3 to 5 large conical scales. Tympanum absent. Tail is short and prehensile. Dorsal scales enlarged. Gualr sacs laterally compressed. Some individuals show orange patches. Pre-anal and femoral pores absent. 
Dorsum is olive green with darker markings, forming 3 bands on body and more on tail. A light spot on nape. A broad stripe along anterior of body and one in front of the eyes. Limbs are dark-banded.

Distribution and habitat
A slow-moving lizard, found on moss-covered tree trunks in montane regions of Sri Lanka. Localities include Nuwara Eliya, Horton Plains, Hakgala, Adam's Peak and Knuckles Mountain Range.

Ecology and reproduction
Inhibits within forest mosaic comprising Cyperus and hedges. Social interactions known to include head-bobbing, in response to threat as well as aggressive between males.
4-5 live young are produced at a time, measuring 47-50mm, between May to August.

References

 http://reptile-database.reptarium.cz/species?genus=Cophotis&species=ceylanica
 https://www.academia.edu/1400812/Description_of_a_second_species_of_Cophotis_Reptilia_Agamidae_from_the_highlands_of_Sri_Lanka

External links 
 https://www.scribd.com/doc/99133138/Jungle-crow-feeding-on-Cophotis-ceylanica-Sri-Lanka
 http://www.sundaytimes.lk/100502/FunDay/fut_05.html

Reptiles of Sri Lanka
Cophotis
Reptiles described in 1861
Taxa named by Wilhelm Peters